SSQ may refer to:

 La Sarre Airport, the IATA code for the Canadian airport
 Shell Lake Municipal Airport, the FAA code for the United States airport
 Social Science Quarterly, a peer-reviewed social science journal
 Society for Software Quality, a professional organization dedicated to the promotion of software quality
 SSQ, a 1980s synthpop band
 Ernie Haase & Signature Sound, also known as Signature Sound Quartet
 SSQ Financial Group, a Canadian financial institution